Blood (2011) is a novel by Australian author Tony Birch. It was shortlisted for the 2012 Miles Franklin Literary Award.

Plot summary

The novel follows a family in crisis, breaking down under the weight of family violence, drugs, lost opportunities and general neglect.

Notes

 Dedication: For Brian and Debbie - with all my love, for taking my hand.
Epigraph:
'Then the boy, me and the boy
we walked for miles through stormy weather
hand in hand, we roamed the land
and held the gleaming heart together.'

Kate Rusby, 'The Bitter Boy'

Bibliography

Reviews

Conrad Walters in The Sydney Morning Herald found the novel to build to a compelling last third but was let down a little by a hurried ending. Ed Wright in The Australian considered it an "absorbing and endearing tale of children in adversity".

Awards and nominations

 2011 highly commended The Fellowship of Australian Writers Victoria Inc. National Literary Awards — FAW Christina Stead Award 
 2012 shortlisted Miles Franklin Literary Award 
 2012 finalist Melbourne Prize for Literature — Best Writing Award 
 2012 winner Melbourne Prize for Literature — Civic Choice Award

References

2011 Australian novels
University of Queensland Press books